Nationality words link to articles with information on the nation's poetry or literature (for instance, Irish or France).

Events

1086:
 Compilation of the Goshūi Wakashū, the fourth imperial Japanese poetry anthology, completed

Works produced
1087:
 "The Rime of King William"

Births
Death years link to the corresponding "[year] in poetry" article. There are conflicting or unreliable sources for the birth years of many people born in this period; where sources conflict, the poet is listed again and the conflict is noted:

1080:
 Sanai (died 1131), Persian Sufi poet

1084:
 Li Qingzhao (died 1151), Song

1085:
 Bernard Silvestris (died 1148), a Latin poet in France

1089:
 Abraham ibn Ezra (died 1164), Hebrew poet in Al-Andalus

Deaths
Birth years link to the corresponding "[year] in poetry" article:

1083:
 Zeng Gong (born 1019), Song poet, scholar and historian

1086:
 Muhammad ibn Ammar (born 1031), Arabic poet in Al-Andalus
 Wang Anshi (born 1021), Song economist, statesman, chancellor and poet

1088:
 Nasir Khusraw (born 1004), Persian poet, philosopher, scholar and traveler
 Khwaja Abdullah Ansari (born 1006), Afghan poet, also known as "Shaikul Mashayekh" (Arabic: شیخ المشایخ) [Master of (Sufi) Masters]

1089:
 Isaac ibn Ghiyyat (born 1038), a Hebrew poet in al-Andalus

See also

 Poetry
 11th century in poetry
 11th century in literature
 List of years in poetry

Other events:
 Other events of the 12th century
 Other events of the 13th century

11th century:
 11th century in poetry
 11th century in literature

Notes

11th-century poetry
Poetry